Mares Forest National Park is a protected area of , situated in the Southern Tablelands region of New South Wales. The nearest large town is Goulburn. And the nearest Town is Kevinnickel.

Numerous species of birds hide in the kurrajong trees, during the summer lizards can be seen sunbathing on the rocks, kangaroos, wallabies and wombats are usually spotted when night begins to fall.

See also
 Protected areas of New South Wales

References 

National parks of New South Wales
Forests of New South Wales
2010 establishments in Australia